The Outstanding Contribution to Computer Science Education award is a prize granted by the Association for Computing Machinery (ACM) Special Interest Group (SIG) on Computer science education (SIGCSE). Outstanding contributions can include curriculum design, innovative teaching methods, authorship of textbooks and the development of novel teaching tools. The award has been granted annually since 1981.

Laureates

References

Academic awards